These are the Canadian number-one country songs of 1971, per the RPM Country Tracks chart.

See also
 1971 in music
 List of number-one country singles of 1971 (U.S.)

References

External links
 Read about RPM Magazine at the AV Trust
 Search RPM charts here at Library and Archives Canada

 
Country
1971